The electoral district of Melbourne is an electorate of the Victorian Legislative Assembly. It currently includes the localities of Docklands, Carlton, Melbourne, East Melbourne, West Melbourne, North Melbourne, Parkville, Newmarket, Kensington and Flemington, and includes Melbourne University. The district has been in existence since 1856 (it was abolished in 1859 and reestablished in 1889).

The electorate was won in 2014 for the first time by Greens candidate Ellen Sandell.

History
Melbourne was one of the inaugural districts of the first Assembly in 1856. Its area was defined by the 1855 Act as: 
 now Flemington Bridge

Melbourne was abolished in 1859, its area was split into the new electoral districts of East Melbourne and West Melbourne, each having two members.

Melbourne was re-created as a single-member electorate by the Electoral Act Amendment Act 1888 which took effect at the 1889 elections.

Since 1908 the seat had been traditional Labor territory since 1908, but had become increasingly marginal against the Greens since 2002. Senior Labor minister Bronwyn Pike successfully held the seat against strong Greens challenges at three subsequent elections, defeating future Greens Senator Richard Di Natale in 2002 and 2006, and prominent lawyer Brian Walters in 2010. Pike resigned in 2012, and Labor candidate and City of Melbourne councillor Jennifer Kanis retained the seat after a closely contested by-election, which saw her finish second on primary votes to Greens candidate Cathy Oke but win on preferences. Kanis lost the seat to Greens candidate Ellen Sandell at the 2014 election. Along with the seat of Prahran it was the first win for the Greens in the Victorian Legislative Assembly.

Members

Election results

Historical maps

Notes
 O'Shanassy won both Melbourne and Kilmore districts, he decided to represent the latter resulting in a by-election for Melbourne.

External links
 Victorian Electoral Commission profile of the district of Melbourne
 Map of the district of Melbourne (.pdf file) 2013
Electoral District of Melbourne, 1855
 Article "Seat of many faces, many landmarks" from The Age

References

Electoral districts of Victoria (Australia)
1856 establishments in Australia
1859 disestablishments in Australia
1889 establishments in Australia
Electoral
Melbourne City Centre
East Melbourne, Victoria
Electoral districts and divisions of Greater Melbourne